Dolichopteryx pseudolongipes,  is a species of fish found Off California and Galapagos Islands in the Eastern Central Pacific Ocean.

Size

References 

Opisthoproctidae
Fish of the Pacific Ocean
Taxa named by Atsushi Fukui
Taxa named by Yasuyuki Kitagawa
Taxa named by Nikolai Vasilyevich Parin
Fish described in 2008